Afroedura rondavelica, also known as the Blyde River flat gecko or rondavel rock gecko, is a species of African geckos, first found in the Limpopo and Mpumalanga provinces of South Africa. Its specific and common name refers to the rondavel, a southern African hut-type structure.

References

Further reading

External links
Reptile database entry

Afroedura
Reptiles described in 2014
Endemic reptiles of South Africa